FurReal Friends (later FurReal in 2017) is a toy brand division of Hasbro, Tiger Electronics and Dreamright Toys created in 2002 focusing on robotic pets. FurReal toys widely vary in style and size, depicting different domestic and wild animals as robotic toys ranging from large enough to be sat on to small enough to be held. Each FurReal robotic toy moves in some way. Two slogans were "They love you for real, FurReal Friends", and (for 2013) "My best friends are FurReal Friends".

Products
FurReal is noted for its animatronic replications of creatures and domestic animals as an alternative to live pets, or emulating the behaviors of pets commonly desired by children including horses, cats, rabbits and dogs. Certain toys may be designed to represent creatures unfit for domestication, like elephants, lions, tigers, leopards, jaguars, unicorns and bears. Bouncy, a robotic puppy, can jump and turn in a circle when a child waves their hand across her head. With Zambi, a robotic elephant manufactured and intended for charitable sales, a portion of its proceeds go toward charities.

The popular toy Tumbles My Roll Over Pup Beagle was launched in 2008. He rolls over, makes realistic puppy noises, and goes to sleep. It comes with an adoption certificate.

Another notable toy manufactured by FurReal was the Butterscotch Pony, a large, animatronic, whinnying pony, among the toy line's products designed for children to sit on. The pony was designed with an assortment of sound effects mimicking those of live horses and opened a gateway to the production of a second animatronic pony named S'mores of slightly higher quality and with more sound effects.

See also
Furby
Beanie Babies
ZhuZhu Pets
Hatchimal

Notes

External links
Official Site
"FurReal Cat popular for the 2002 holiday season"
FurReal Friends Zambi Website - Information about the FurReal Elephant and Project Zambi
Butterscotch Pony
Project Zambi
Official Site
Japanese website
Fan site

Hasbro products
Products introduced in 2002
Toy animals
2000s toys